The 1969–70 IHL season was the 25th season of the International Hockey League (IHL), a North American minor professional league. Eight teams participated in the regular season, and the Dayton Gems won the Turner Cup. Bill Beagan succeeded Andy Mulligan as IHL commissioner in August 1969.

Regular season

Turner Cup-Playoffs

References

External links
 Season 1969/70 on hockeydb.com

IHL
International Hockey League (1945–2001) seasons